National Kaohsiung Marine University (NKMU) was a university in Nanzih District, Kaohsiung, Taiwan. The current total number of students is 8,000. In 2018, it has been merged into the "Nanzih Campus" and "Cijin Campus" of National Kaohsiung University of Science and Technology.

History
In order to increase the economic and trade development of southern Taiwan, the government established the Kaohsiung branch of the Provincial Keelung Marine and Fishery Senior Vocational School in 1946. Two years later, the Kaohsiung branch became the independent Kaohsiung Marine and Fishery Senior Vocational School. In a very short time, the School became the driving force behind the development of marine-related industries in southern Taiwan. With the rapid economic and trade development of the nation and the increasing demand for marine professionals, the School was elevated to the status of junior college in 1967. Graduates from two-year programs were competitively sought-after. In 1997, the government elevated the College's status to institute of technology allowing it to provide opportunities for advance study to vocational school graduates. At the same time, the school started to recruit university students. As graduates entered the workplace, the marine industries received a fresh burst of energy. In 2004, the university was renamed National Kaohsiung Marine University.

Faculties
 College of Hydrosphere Science
 College of Management
 College of Maritime Affairs
 College of Ocean Engineering

See also
 List of universities in Taiwan

References

1946 establishments in Taiwan
2018 disestablishments in Taiwan
Defunct universities and colleges in Taiwan
Educational institutions established in 1946
National Kaohsiung University of Science and Technology